The Inca flycatcher (Leptopogon taczanowskii) is a species of bird in the family Tyrannidae. It is endemic to Peru.

Its natural habitat is subtropical or tropical moist montane forests.

References

Inca flycatcher
Birds of the Peruvian Andes
Endemic birds of Peru
Inca flycatcher
Taxonomy articles created by Polbot